The 17th BRDC International Trophy was a motor race, run to Formula One rules, held on 15 May 1965 at the Silverstone Circuit, England. The race was run over 52 laps of the Silverstone Grand Prix circuit, and was won by British driver Jackie Stewart in a BRM P261.

Results

References
 "The Grand Prix Who's Who", Steve Small, 1995.
 "The Formula One Record Book", John Thompson, 1974.

BRDC International Trophy
BRDC International Trophy
BRDC
BRDC International Trophy